Charcoal Lane is the debut studio album by Australian singer song writer Archie Roach, released in 1990.

Name
From the 1960s through to the 1980s, the inner-city Melbourne suburb of Fitzroy was a meeting place for Aboriginal people who had left missions, Aboriginal reserves, and other government institutions and drifted to the city in a bid to trace their families,  and Roach was one of these. A street behind a factory was a meeting and drinking place known to the community as Charcoal Lane.

In 2009 the old Aboriginal Health Service building at 136 Gertrude Street was converted into a social enterprise restaurant, which was called Charcoal Lane at the request of the local Koori community, and provided training for Aboriginal and Torres Strait Islander young people. It closed its doors in August 2021, during the COVID-19 pandemic, with the building being returned to the Victorian Aboriginal Health Service.

Other musicians

Vika and Linda Bull were backing vocalists on the album. Tim Finn provided backing vocals on "Took the Children Away".

Reception, ratings, awards

The album was released in May 1990 and peaked at number 86 on the ARIA Charts in April 1991. At the ARIA Music Awards of 1991, the album received three nominations, winning two; ARIA Award for Best New Talent and Best Indigenous Release.

Rolling Stone said "In the best singer-songwriter tradition, Charcoal Lane is deeply moving in both personal and political terms".

The album was certified gold in 1992.

25th anniversary edition
A 25th Anniversary Edition of the album was released in November 2015; including the original disc plus new interpretations by Australian artists and five live recordings from 1990.

Track listing

Charts

Certifications

Release history

References

1990 debut albums
Mushroom Records albums
Archie Roach albums
ARIA Award-winning albums